King or Queen may refer to:

Monarch, the sovereign head of state in a monarchy
King or Queen, single by Bow Wow in 2014
"King or Queen", song by Kylie Minogue from X